Lyman Emmet Kipp, Jr. (December 24, 1929 - March 30, 2014) was a sculptor and painter who created pieces that are composed of strong vertical and horizontal objects and were often painted in bold primary colors recalling arrangements by De Stijl Constructivists. Kipp is an important figure in the development of the Primary Structure style which came to prominence in the mid-1960s.

Kipp's early work in the 1950s focused on geometric, plaster reliefs and cast bronzes (see No. 1 - 1959 or Directional I). He moved on to large, geometric, welded pieces composed of post and beam elements emphasizing the vertical during the 1960s (see Andy's Cart Blanche, Muscoot or Hudson Bay). Finding it difficult to transport large, heavy, welded pieces, he turned to angled sections and sheets of steel and aluminum that could be bolted together on site. Typically the pieces were painted with bright colors and the thin edges were often defined with bright, complementary colors (see Long Distance, Chicksaw or Kobi). In the late 1970s, Kipp's steel sheets began to move into the air on thin legs (see Lockport 1977, Salute to Knowledge or Yoakum Jack).

Kipp was a founding member of ConStruct, the artist-owned gallery that promoted and organized large-scale sculpture exhibitions throughout the United States. Other founding members include Mark di Suvero, Kenneth Snelson, John Raymond Henry and Charles Ginnever.

Kipp's health deteriorated and he died peacefully on March 30, 2014. His last known works were in 2011.

Education/Teaching/Grants 
1950 - 1952 Pratt Institute, Brooklyn, NY 
1952 - 1954 Cranbrook Academy of Art, Michigan

1960 - 1963 Bennington College, Vermont 
1962 - 1963 Pratt Institute, Brooklyn, NY 
1963 - 1968 Hunter College, NYC
1966 Dartmouth College, NH (Visiting Artist)
1968 - 1975  Lehman College, NYC (Chairman - 1968 - 1974) 
1975 - 1978 Hunter College, NYC (Chairman) 
1978 - 1985 Hunter College, NYC 
1985 Hunter College, NYC (Professor Emeritus)

1966 Guggenheim Fellowship 
1966 Fulbright Grant 
1967 Summer Research Grant, City University of New York
1970 City University Faculty Research Grant
1975 City University Faculty Research Grant
1977 Art Park, Lewiston, NY
1980 Hand Hollow Foundation, New York
1982 Schuster Grant

Monumental sculptures and public works

United States

Alabama

 Cherokee, 1977, University of Alabama, Huntsville

Arizona

 Hudson Bay, 1968, Museum of Art, University of Arizona, Tucson

California

 Trap II, 1965, University Art Museum, University of California, Berkeley
 Chickasaw, 1977, California State University, San Bernardino
 Highline, 1976, Federal Building & Post Office, Van Nuys

Colorado

 Alto, 1984, Hoffman Heights Library, Aurora
 Red Wing, 1974, Aurora Corporate Plaza, Aurora

District of Columbia

 Alternate Design for Highline, 1975, Smithsonian American Art Museum, Washington
 Salamanca, 1969, Smithsonian American Art Museum, Washington

Florida

 Dollbaby, 1991, Pinewood Park, Largo
 Levenworth, 1978, Pinewood Park, Largo
 Blackjack, Miami Cancer Institute, Baptist Health, Miami
 D, Greynolds Park, North Miami Beach
 Tonawanda, 1977, Florida Coastal Professional Center, Naples
 Kenosha, 1984, von Liebig Art Center, Naples
 Untitled (blue/red), 1984, von Liebig Art Center, Naples
 Untitled (black/red), 1984, von Liebig Art Center, Naples
 E, 1979, Vero Beach Museum of Art, Vero Beach

Indiana

 Range, 1974, Fort Wayne Museum of Art, Fort Wayne

Massachusetts

 Auro, 1965, List Visual Arts Center, Massachusetts Institute of Technology, Cambridge

Michigan

 No. 1-1959, 1959, Museum of Art, University of Michigan, Ann Arbor
 Oshkosh, 1978, Grand Rapids Art Museum, Grand Rapids
 Bullshoals, 1978, Grand Rapids Art Museum, Grand Rapids
 Kobi, 1982, Grand Rapids Art Museum, Grand Rapids
 Study for Zephyr, 1973, Grand Rapids Art Museum, Grand Rapids
 Salute to Knowledge, 1981, Grosse Pointe Public Library, Grosse Pointe Farms
 Muscoot, 1979, Calvin College Campus, Grand Rapids
 Long Distance, 1979, Calvin College Campus, Grand Rapids

Nebraska

 Ulysses, 1972, Sheldon Memorial Art Gallery and Sculpture Garden, University of Nebraska, Lincoln

New Hampshire

 Bartar, 1968, Hood Museum of Art, Dartmouth College, Hanover
 Median II, 1963, Hood Museum of Art, Dartmouth College, Hanover

New York

 Wild Rice, 1967, The Governor Nelson A. Rockefeller Empire State Plaza Art Collection, west plaza, Albany
 Directional I, 1962, Albright-Knox Art Gallery, Buffalo
 Flat Rate II, 1969, Albright-Knox Art Gallery, Buffalo
 Trianon, 1963, Whitney Museum of American Art, NYC
 Lockport 1977, 1977, Storm King Art Center, Mountainville
 Untitled, Storm King Art Center, Mountainville
 Placid, 1978, Lake Placid Center for the Arts, Lake Placid

New Jersey

 Yoakum Jack, 1977, William Paterson University, Wayne

Pennsylvania

 Music Box, 1956, Philadelphia Museum of Art, Philadelphia
 Manly, 1980, Hartwood Acres Park, Pittsburgh
 Wink, 1980, Penn State University, University Park

Tennessee

 Dragon Fly, 1995, Sculpture Fields of Montague Park, Chattanooga
 Hugo, 1980, Sculpture Fields of Montague Park, Chattanooga

Wisconsin

 Bullfinch, 1968, Lynden Sculpture Garden, Milwaukee
 Lodgepole, 1968, Lynden Sculpture Garden, Milwaukee

References
Janovy, Karen O., Siedell, Daniel A., Sculpture from the Sheldon Memorial Art Gallery (University of Nebraska Press, 2006) 
Sculpture Off the Pedestal (Grand Rapids Art Museum, 1973) Library of Congress: 73-88657
Construct (Fine Arts Museum of Long Island, 1979)
Kipp Website

1929 births
2014 deaths
Cranbrook Academy of Art faculty
Hunter College faculty
Lehman College faculty
People from Dobbs Ferry, New York
Sculptors from New York (state)
Pratt Institute alumni
Pratt Institute faculty
Bennington College faculty
Dartmouth College faculty